Hemant Mohapatra (born 1980) is an Indian poet writing in English. He is featured in the 2011 Best New Poets series distributed by University of Virginia Press. His work has been published in some international journals such as Eclectica, BrinkLit, Asia Writes and the Paterson Literary Review as part of the Allen Ginsberg Poetry Awards series. He is also the winner of the second Srinivas Rayaprol Award  and the HarperCollins Poetry Prize. With the change in immigration rules under the Trump administration, he left San Francisco, after living there for many years. He is currently based in India.

References

External links
 "Best New Poets website" 

Indian male poets
Living people
1980 births